is a Japanese professional footballer player who currently plays for Liga de Elite side Chao Pak Kei.

Club career
He played top league Kashiwa Reysol in Japan. And he also played in Japan national team U15,16,17,18,20. He moved to Sao Paulo FC in Brazil when he was 16 years old. He played for three years at Sao Paulo FC. He then played in Brazil for eight years. And he played as a professional player in Portugal, Latvia, Indonesia, India, Singapore, Bahrain. He also played in Poland top league Korona Kielce in Europe.

On 24 November 2017, Chao Pak Kei signed Saito to a one-year contract.

Club
2003-2005 U21São Paulo FC
2005-2006 São Paulo
2006-2007 AD Guarujá
2007-2008 Mixto
2008-2010 AD Guarujá
2010-2011 Jacareí Atlético Clube
2011-2011 Kashiwa Reysol
2012-2012 CF Fão
2013-2013 Warriors FC
2012-2014 Korona Kielce
2014-2014 Salgaocar 
2015 FK Tukums 2000
2016 PSM Makassar
2016-2017 Sitra Club 
2017 FC UBU
2017- Chao Pak Kei

International career
Saito has represented Japan at numerous youth levels. He was a member of the Japan team for the Japan U15, U16, U18, U20, U21 tours in England.

Gallery

References
 - Player Profile ZEROZERO
 - GOAL webnews
 - Salgaocar fc web
 - Japan news
 - ZOFOOTY
- Europanews
 -Poland news
- Soccernewspoland
- Kielcenews
- soccerkiecenews
Saito w Koronie! Poland news
Japończyk Seiji Saito podpisał kontrakt z Koroną - Koraona Kielce web 

Living people
Japanese footballers
Japanese expatriate footballers
Japanese expatriate sportspeople in India
Expatriate footballers in Thailand
Expatriate footballers in India
Expatriate footballers in Poland
Expatriate footballers in Macau
I-League players
Salgaocar FC players
1986 births
Association football defenders
C.F. Fão players